The Iberian Massif (also Hesperian, Hesperic, Hercynian Massif or Meseta block) is the pre-Mesozoic core of the Iberian Peninsula. Roughly covering the western half of the Peninsula, it includes all its Precambrian and Paleozoic materials and it is limited by the Cantabrian Sea to the North, the Atlantic Ocean to the West, the Guadalquivir sedimentary basin to the South. The western part features Paleozoic materials, while the east part features basins covered by Tertiary deposits.

References 
Citations

Bibliography
 
 

Geology of the Iberian Peninsula